John-Paul ('JP') Marks is a senior civil servant who has served as the Permanent Secretary to the Scottish Government since 2022. He previously worked in the UK Government's Department for Work and Pensions, serving as the Director General for Work and Health Services from 2019 to 2022 and Director General for Universal Credit Operations from 2018 to 2019.

Early life 
John-Paul Marks was born in Jersey in the Channel Islands. The son of Susan Marks and Dr Michael Marks, he attended the Victoria College. He studied at Cambridge University from 1999 to 2002 and earned a MA in social and political science.

Career 
Marks joined the UK civil service in 2004. In HM Treasury, he served as the Speechwriter to the Chief Secretary to the Treasury. Marks spent much of his career before the Scottish Government at the Department for Work and Pensions, latterly as Director General. He served as Principal Private Secretary to Yvette Cooper and Iain Duncan Smith, and was Private Secretary to Mike O'Brien among other roles.

Personal life 
Marks is married with two children.

References

Living people
Year of birth missing (living people)
Permanent Secretaries of the Scottish Executive
Jersey politicians